Anaxarcha intermedia is a species of praying mantis found in India.

See also
List of mantis genera and species

References

Inter
Mantodea of Asia
Endemic fauna of India
Insects of India
Insects described in 1995